Tukgahgo Mountain (TUG-a-ho) is a mountain in the Takshanuk Mountains in the U.S. state of Alaska with a peak elevation of . Geological investigations of the veins in the mountain have revealed silver, gold, platinum, and palladium mineralization, derived from mid-Cretaceous events.

Geography

Tukgahgo, an indigenous name given by the Tlingits, was recorded by geologist Eugene C. Robertson and published by the United States Geological Survey (USGS) in 1952. The head of Shakuseyi Creek is on the east slope of the mountain.

Geology
A 1991 geological sampling of a rock formation  to the southwest of Tukgahgo Mountain on the northwest Chilly Peak (elevation  was initially given the informal name "Chilly." The geologic formations of the area consist of metabasalts and amphibolites, which are enclosed as roof pendants within the hornblende diorite, granodiorite and monzonite. The intrusive rocks are inferred to be part of the Mount Kashagnak pluton. A few quartz veins were also identified, though they were scattered; they are integral to the Tukgahgo Mountain fault. Along the fault metabasalts to the southwest are in fault contact with the diorite intrusive.
  
Samples collected from the veins were analyzed for metals like molybdenum, platinum and palladium. One vein with visible molybdenite assayed at 1,240 ppm across the vein. Quartz veins also revealed pyrite, chalcopyrite, malachite, and molybdenite. The gold content was reported to be 0.824 ppm, while silver and copper contents were of the order of 2.70 ppm and 2,140 ppm, respectively. The mineralization is interpreted as of mid-Cretaceous age.  The metallic elements identified as present in the vein structures include silver, gold, copper, with minor quantities of palladium and platinum but no mining operations have been reported.

References

External links
 

Mountains of Haines Borough, Alaska
North American 1000 m summits